The 1998–99 NCAA football bowl games concluded the 1998 NCAA Division I-A football season. In the first year of the Bowl Championship Series (BCS) era, Tennessee defeated Florida State in the 1999 Fiesta Bowl, designated as the BCS National Championship Game for the 1998 season.

A total of 22 bowl games were played between December 19, 1998 and January 4, 1999 by 44 bowl-eligible teams. Two new bowl games were established in 1998–99: the Oahu Bowl and the Music City Bowl.

Non-BCS bowls

BCS bowls

References